Dini Ouattara (born 21 December 1994) is an Ivorian professional footballer who played as a goalkeeper for Uthongathi Football Club in South Africa.

Club career

Ivory Coast
Ouattara was born in Agbaillé, Ivory Coast. He started his career at Société Omnisports de l'Armée academy in Ivory Coast. After couple of years he got promoted to the senior team of SOA.

Al-Nahda
In 2014, he first move abroad to Libya. There he signed a two-year contract with Al Nahda. Playing in Libya helps him a lot professionally. He got some official matches under his belt, then he decided to move to Asia for better contract for the future.

Stallion
In 2016, Ouattara moved to Asia and received contract in 2nd division Philippines club Stallion FC. After impressive performance in Stallion, Ouattara got recruited by Inter Manila for 6 months.

Mendiola
In January 2019, Ouattara got an offer from top division Philippines league club, Mendiola. He was one of the best goalkeepers in the league and had 10 clean sheets in the league. In 2020, Ouattara again signed with Mendiola for one more season.

Uthongathi 
In 2021, Ouattara got an offer from The National First Division club, Uthongathi F.C. He was one of the goalkeepers that performed for the team during the GladAfrica Championship.

References 

Living people
1994 births
Ivorian footballers
Association football goalkeepers
SOA (football club) players
Mendiola F.C. 1991 players
Philippines Football League players
Ivorian expatriate footballers
Expatriate footballers in the Philippines